Awiyaana (Auyana) is a Kainantu language of Papua New Guinea.

References

Kainantu–Goroka languages
Languages of Eastern Highlands Province